BD+03 2562 is a very-low-metallicity star in the constellation of Virgo. It is located about 8,500 light-years (2,600 parsecs) from Earth.

Planetary system
The star is orbited by a superjovian exoplanet, BD+03 2562 b, which was discovered in 2017 by a radial velocity method.

References

K-type giants
Virgo (constellation)
BD+03 2562
J11501555+0245365
Planetary systems with one confirmed planet